Marcus Serup Hannesbo (born 11 May 2002) is a Danish football player who plays for AC Horsens, on loan from AaB.

Club career
He made his Danish Superliga debut for AaB on 3 February 2021 in a game against F.C. Copenhagen and scored a goal on his debut. He scored his second goal four days later against Brøndby IF.

On 31 January 2022, Hannesbo joined Danish 1st Division club FC Fredericia on a loan deal until the end of the season. On 8 July 2022, Hannesbo was loaned out again, this time to newly promoted Danish Superliga club AC Horsens.

References

External links
 

2002 births
Living people
Danish men's footballers
Denmark youth international footballers
Association football midfielders
AaB Fodbold players
FC Fredericia players
AC Horsens players
Danish Superliga players
Danish 1st Division players